Colonial Hills is a neighborhood in the northernmost section of East Point, Georgia.  It rests alongside of Langford Parkway (previously known as Lakewood Freeway.) Just to the north of Colonial Hills is Fort McPherson-(known as Fort Mac), which has been closed due to military downsizing. Colonial Hills consists of the following streets: Chambers Ave., Clermont Ave., Dauphine St., Elizabeth Ln., Hawthorne Way, Newnan Ave., St. Francis Ave., St. Joseph Ave., St. Michael Ave., McClelland Ave., McPherson Dr., & Womack Ave.

Neighborhood Association
Colonial Hills Neighborhood Association, Inc. (CHNA) is a voluntary association of individuals the purposes of which, as set forth in the articles of incorporation, are exclusively charitable, education and cultural within the meaning of Section 501(c)(3) of the Internal Revenue Code. The purposes of the Corporation shall include, but shall not be limited to, the following:
To foster a sense of community among the residents of Colonial Hills and the city of East Point and heighten awareness of issues affecting the same through education and communication.
To engage in non-partisan, non-political activities that foster communication and civic pride among residents of Colonial Hills and the citizens of East Point
To perform all other acts necessary or incidental to the above and to do whatever is deemed necessary, useful, advisable, or conducive, directly or indirectly, to carry out any of the purposes of the Corporation, as set forth in the articles of incorporation and these bylaws, including the exercise of all other power and authority enjoyed by the Corporation generally by virtue of the provisions of the Georgia Nonprofit Corporation Code (subject to and within the limitations of Section 501(c)(3) of the Internal Revenue Code).

Schools
Schools that serve the Colonial Hills area:
 HAMILTON E. HOLMES Elementary School
 PAUL D. WEST Middle School
 TRI-CITIES High School
 Cameron Academy
 Jere A. Wells
 Colonial Hills Christian School (K-12) was located here for over 38 years.
 Romar Academy

External links
 Colonial Hills Neighborhood Association

Geography of Fulton County, Georgia
Neighborhoods in Georgia (U.S. state)
East Point, Georgia